The 1894 Harrow on the Hill Urban District Council election took place in December 1894 to elect members of Harrow on the Hill Urban District Council in London, England. The council had been created under the Local Government Act 1894, and the whole council was up for election.

Election result

References

1894
Harrow on the Hill
1894 English local elections